Jimmy McClearn is an Irish politician serving as a Galway County Councillor and the former Mayor of County Galway from 2010-2011.

A native of Killimor, McClern is a member of Fine Gael. He defeated Sinn Féin’s Dermot Connolly for the position of Mayor in January 2010. A previous County Mayor, Eddie Haverty, was also a native of Killimor.

McClearn served on the county council from 1991 to 2004, and again from 2009, for the Loughrea area. He is married to Noreen and has three children.

External links
 http://www.galway.ie/en/AboutYourCouncil/Councillors/MeettheMayor/Name,10454,en.html
 http://www.galwaynews.ie/13437-county%E2%80%99s-new-mayor-fulfils-lifelong-ambition
 http://www.portumna.net/news/localpapers/100623.html#2

Politicians from County Galway
Living people
Fine Gael politicians
Local councillors in County Galway
Year of birth missing (living people)